Černovice is a municipality and village in Plzeň-South District in the Plzeň Region of the Czech Republic. It has about 200 inhabitants.

Administrative parts
The village of Nemněnice is an administrative part of Černovice.

History
The first written mention of Černovice is from 1362.

From 1 January 2021, Černovice is no longer a part of Domažlice District and belongs to Plzeň-South District.

References

Villages in Plzeň-South District